Oleksandr Vladlenovych Martynenko is a Ukrainian media director and journalist, former press secretary of President of Ukraine Leonid Kuchma.

In 1998, he was a deputy chief of the Presidential Administration of Ukraine helping Yevhen Kushnariov.

Martynenko has been a director of Interfax-Ukraine from its foundation in 1992 to 1998 and since 2003.

External links
 Oleksandr Martynenko's brief profile

1960 births
Living people
Writers from Kharkiv
National University of Kharkiv alumni
Ukrainian journalists